The Hotel Oran Bay, Managed by Accor,  is a luxury five-star hotel in Oran, Algeria.

History
The hotel opened on 8 September 2005 as the Sheraton Oran Hotel and Towers. It left Sheraton and joined Accor Hotels in 2021. It is set to be renamed Pullman Oran Hotel in 2022, following renovations.

Facilities
The hotel contains 321 rooms, 39 suites and 1 presidential suite. It contains a banquet centre with 3 ballrooms, each measuring 820 square metres. The hotel is served by Le Ciel d'Oran and El Andalus serving Spanish and Oriental cuisine, Canastal Brasserie and Le pub Bar which serves British Cuisine.

Gallery

References

External links
Hotel Oran Bay official Facebook page

Hotels in Oran
Hotels in Algeria
Skyscrapers in Algeria
Skyscraper hotels
Hotels established in 2005
Hotel buildings completed in 2005
21st-century architecture in Algeria